CONTEST is the United Kingdom's counter-terrorism strategy, first developed by Sir David Omand and the Home Office in early 2003 as the immediate response to 9/11, and a revised version was made public in 2006. Further revisions were published on 24 March 2009, 11 July 2011 and June 2018. An Annual Report on the implementation of CONTEST was released in March 2010 and in April 2014. The aim of the strategy is "to reduce the risk to the UK and its interests overseas from terrorism so that people can go about their lives freely and with confidence." The success of this strategy is not linked to total elimination of the terrorist threat, but to reducing the threat sufficiently to allow the citizens a normal life free from fear.

CONTEST is composed of the "four Ps" – prevent, pursue, protect, and prepare – which aim to reduce terrorism at all levels through: Preventing more people from being radicalised; Pursuing suspects operationally and legally; Protecting the public through security measures, and Preparing to manage the response to mitigate the impact of an inevitable attack.

Longevity 
CONTEST has thus far survived to its  Prime Minister largely due to its risk equation, that: risk = likelihood × vulnerability × impact.

Likelihood encompasses the Pursue and Prevent arms, and is understood to prevail when terrorists are imprisoned and so unable to radicalise the next generation.

Vulnerability covers Protecting the critical infrastructure and public of the UK, for example ensuring steel lockable cockpit doors on all civilian airliners to prevent hijackers from taking control of aircraft.

Finally, impact includes the Prepare arm. In order to manage the initial response and minimise periods of disruption all emergency services are specifically trained in terrorist response and special technology has been developed, such as decontamination trucks and increasingly resilient communication lines.

The four Ps

Prevent 

The purpose of Prevent is to stop people from becoming terrorists or terrorist sympathisers. Prevent includes countering terrorist ideology and challenging those who promote it, supporting individuals who are especially vulnerable to becoming radicalised, and working with sectors and institutions where the risk of radicalisation is assessed to be high. The deradicalisation programme is known as Channel. It is led by the police and liberal Muslim mentors. The UK Counter-Terrorism and Security Act 2015 created a positive duty for those working in education or health to report those who they deem at risk of radicalization.

As of February 2015, all National Health Service (NHS) staff are required to undergo basic Prevent Awareness Training.

Schools are valuable in providing the educational dimension of the Prevent duty through the Citizenship lessons on the National Curriculum. Since July 2015, schools also have a legal responsibility to have "due regard to the need to prevent people from being drawn into terrorism" under the Prevent duty and Child Protection and Safeguarding guidelines.

In 2020, 6,287 people were referred to Prevent. Of these, 1,424 were referred to Channel and 697 were taken on as cases for Channel. 43% of the cases taken on by Channel were for right wing extremism and 30% for Islamic extremism. A film associated with Prevent, Reclaim Radical – Radical versus Radicalised, was released in 2017. 

An independent review of Prevent was announced in August 2019 as part of the Counter-Terrorism and Border Security Act 2019.

The leader of the 2017 London Bridge attack and his brother were involved with Prevent. The perpetrator of the 2017 Parsons Green train bombing had been referred to Prevent. The perpetrator in the 2021 murder of David Amess was referred to Prevent.

Pursue 
The purpose of Pursue is to stop terrorist attacks by detecting, prosecuting, and disrupting those who plot to carry out attacks against the UK or its interests overseas.

Protect 
The purpose of Protect is to strengthen protection against terrorist attacks in the UK or its interests overseas and thus reduce vulnerability. The work focuses on border security, the transport system, national infrastructure, and public places. The process works by first recognising the threats and then identifying the measures to reduce risks. An example of 'Protect' are the large bollards placed strategically around busy city centres, and especially on bridges, to prevent the rise of vehicle-based attacks such as the 2017 London Bridge attack.

Prepare 
The purpose of Prepare is to mitigate the impact of a terrorist attack in an event whereby that attack cannot be stopped. "Prepare" includes bringing a terrorist attack to an end quickly, preventing its spread, and increasing the UK's resilience to enable rapid recovery in its aftermath.

Channel 
Channel is a programme that seeks to reduce radicalisation by referring reported individuals to other services. People working in health or education are required by law to report individuals that meet certain criteria. A channel referral is a referral to the police, who continually use information obtained in order to assess risk and may make a referral to a channel panel who suggest and prioritise referrals to other services. Involvement is voluntary and referred individuals can refuse to participate. If an individual refuses to participate and a risk is identified the police will be informed and assessments can be made by a channel panel whether an individual chooses to participate or not.

Revision 
The August 2018 strategy reportedly puts more focus on ways of prevention and how to best alert the public to terrorist threats. In an article written for The Observer, former UK Prime Minister Gordon Brown stated that the strategy is "recognised by our allies to be world-leading in its wide-ranging nature, [and] leaves us better prepared and strengthened in our ability to ensure all peace-loving people of this country can live normally, with confidence and free from fear."

Criticism 
The 'Prevent' strategy was criticised in 2009 by Shami Chakrabarti, director of Liberty, as a domestic spying programme collecting intelligence about the beliefs of British Muslims not involved in criminal activity. The Communities and Local Government Committee were also critical of the Prevent programme in 2010, stating that it stigmatised and alienated the Muslims the government wanted to work with.

Prevent has been criticised as legitimising and reinforcing Islamophobia and restricting freedom of expression for Muslims in the UK.

At the National Union of Teachers' 2016 conference in Brighton, the union members voted overwhelmingly against the Prevent strategy. They supported its abolition, citing concerns over the implementation of the strategy and causing "suspicion in the classroom and confusion in the staff room."

In June 2016, the MPs Lucy Allan and Norman Lamb introduced a private member's bill to repeal provisions in the Counter-Terrorism and Security Act 2015 where it requires staff to report possible signs of extremism or radicalization between primary and nursery school-aged children, following several high-profile cases where the provision was inappropriately used about the Prevent strategy. The Bill did not become law.

In 2017, two brothers, aged seven and five, were paid damages after they were reported to the Prevent programme after telling a teacher they had been given toy guns. The children had been kept from parents for two hours. After a legal challenge, the Central Bedfordshire council admitted the children's human rights were breached and they had been racially discriminated against.

Prevent has also been accused of reducing academic freedom. In November 2018, the University of Reading highlighted the article Our Morals: The Ethics of Revolution by Professor Norman Geras as potentially harmful. Students were instructed not to download the article on personal devices and not to leave the article where it could be visible "inadvertently or otherwise, by those who are not prepared to view it". In March 2019, the Court of Appeal found that the Prevent guidance on inviting controversial speakers at universities was unlawfully unbalanced and must be rewritten.

In January 2020, The Guardian reported that Extinction Rebellion, the climate emergency campaign group promoted by Greta Thunberg, had been wrongly included on an official list of extremist organisations whose members should be reported to the authorities. The South East Counter Terrorism Unit later said that after review, the document was being withdrawn. Amnesty International were highly critical of the error, and Extinction Rebellion said they were considering legal action.

COVID-19
There is growing concern over the link of the COVID-19 pandemic and a greater risk of radicalisation. Due to social isolation and increased reliance on the internet, there are concerns over the potential grooming, and later radicalisation, of vulnerable young people. As a result of face-to-face teaching being suspended and most schools and statutory agencies closing throughout the nationwide lockdown, there has been a marked decreased in the number of people referred to the Prevent programme since restrictions were put in place. Whilst the full effect of COVID restrictions are yet to be seen, the police are encouraging schools to place an emphasis on safeguarding those most vulnerable and provide the resources necessary to help combat radicalisation grooming.

References

External links
 Countering International Terrorism: The United Kingdom's Strategy

2006 documents
2006 in the United Kingdom
Counterterrorism in the United Kingdom
Home Office (United Kingdom)
Islamic terrorism in the United Kingdom